Burswood canal was one of the earliest public works conducted in the Swan River Colony (now Western Australia) on the Burswood peninsula on the Swan River in the 1830s. It was made to shorten the journey on the Swan River, between Fremantle and Guildford. At that time Guildford was more prominent than Perth.

It was located in what is now Burswood. When the South Western Railway line over the area was built – a small bridge was made over the canal and a road bridge was built as well.

See also
 Canals in Australia

References

Swan River (Western Australia)
Burswood, Western Australia
Canals in Australia
Transport buildings and structures in Western Australia
State Register of Heritage Places in the Town of Victoria Park